Tina Rivers Ryan is an American curator, researcher, author, and art historian. Her expertise is in new media art, which includes digital art, and internet art. She has been an assistant curator at the Albright–Knox Art Gallery in Buffalo, New York since 2017.

Early life and education 
Tina Rivers Ryan attended Gulliver Preparatory School in Miami for high school. She has a BA degree from Harvard University, and a PhD from Columbia University. Her dissertation was, 'Lights in Orbit': The Howard Wise Gallery and the Rise of Media in the 1960s (2014), her doctoral advisor was Branden W. Joseph. She worked as a fellow at the Metropolitan Museum of Art.

Career 
In 2017, Ryan was hired at Albright-Knox Art Gallery in Buffalo, New York. Prior to her appointment she previously worked at the New Museum, MoMA PS1, and the Institute of Contemporary Art, Boston. Ryan has researched "time-based media" of the 1960s and 1970s. She has also been involved in the study and research of digital art preservation, including NFTs.

Ryan and co-curator  organized the 2021 exhibition Difference Machines: Technology and Identity in Contemporary Art at the gallery. The Difference Machines exhibition features 17 artists and has a hybrid display design featuring interactivity, the artwork is technical but also accessible to people without technical knowledge, and it exists as a learning space. A review in The Brooklyn Rail discussed the exhibition's themes of "the use of digital technologies for passive (but not always effective) surveillance, how identities are shaped by technology, the erasure of marginalized communities, and the active reassertion of control."

Other exhibitions at Albright-Knox she has co-curated include Tony Conrad: A Retrospective (2018), and We The People: New Art from the Collection (2018–2019).

Publications

Co-authored or contributed

Exhibition-related

See also 
 Conservation and restoration of time-based media art
 Digital curation
 Women in the art history field

References 

Women art historians
American women curators
American curators
Gulliver Preparatory School alumni
Harvard University alumni
Columbia University alumni
Year of birth missing (living people)
Living people
American art historians
Historians from Florida
21st-century American historians